Sappa Creek is a stream in the central Great Plains of North America. A tributary of the Republican River, it flows for  through the American states of Kansas and Nebraska.

Geography
Sappa Creek originates in the High Plains of northwest Kansas. From there, in flows generally northeast into south-central Nebraska. In west-central Harlan County, Nebraska, it joins the Republican River.

History
In 1878, the Sappa Creek valley in Kansas was the scene of the last raid by Native Americans (Indians) in Kansas. In the Northern Cheyenne Exodus after the Battle of Punished Woman's Fork, a band of Cheyenne needing horses and provisions raged through the valley, killing more than 30 civilians and raping several woman. Several Cheyenne elderly, women, and children were also killed in the region by soldiers and civilians. In Oberlin, the Decatur County Last Indian Raid Museum commemorates the Cheyenne raid.

See also
List of rivers of Kansas

References

Rivers of Kansas